Monguel is a department of Gorgol Region in Mauritania.

List of municipalities in the department 
The Monguel department is made up of following municipalities:

 Azgueilem Tiyab
 Bethet Meit
 Bokkol
 Melzem Teichett
 Monguel

In 2000, the entire population of the Monguel Department has a total of 32 558 inhabitants  (15 280 men and 17 278 women).

References 

Departments of Mauritania